Domikan is the name of several rural localities in Russia:
Domikan (village), a selo in Novospassky Selsoviet of Arkharinsky District of Amur Oblast
Domikan (station), a selo in Chernigovsky Selsoviet of Arkharinsky District of Amur Oblast